Flake or Flakes may refer to:

People 
 Floyd H. Flake (born 1945), A.M.E. minister, university administrator, former U.S. representative
 Jeff Flake (born 1962), American politician
 Christian "Flake" Lorenz, German musician and member of the band Rammstein
 Jake Flake, American politician
 Magdalene Schauss-Flake (1921-2008), German composer and organist

Arts, entertainment, and media

Music

Groups
 Flake (band), an Australian psyche/prog rock band from Sydney, active in the late 1960s and early 1970s
 Flake, the original name of the band Flake Music, the predecessor of The Shins

Songs
 "Flake" (song), a song from the 2001 album Brushfire Fairytales by Jack Johnson
 "Flake", an early song by System of a Down, see System of a Down discography
 "Flakes", a song from the 1979 album Sheik Yerbouti by Frank Zappa
 "Flakes", a song from the 2008 album Twenty One by the Mystery Jets

Other arts, entertainment, and media
 Flakes (film), a 2007 film with Aaron Stanford and Zooey Deschanel
 Flakes (manga), a manga anthology by Naoki Yamamoto

Food and food preparation 
 Flake (chocolate bar), a brand of chocolate bar manufactured by Cadbury
 Flake (fish), an Australian term for edible flesh of one of several species of shark
 Flake, an individual popped kernel of corn 
 Fish flake, a platform for drying cod

Science and technology 
 Flake (software), a software library for KDE
 Flake tobacco, used in a smoking pipe
 Flake8, a Python wrapper for PyFlakes, pycodestyle, and Ned Batchelder's McCabe script, similar to Pylint
 Lithic flake,  a fragment of stone found in archaeology
 Nano flake,  a novel shape of semiconductor nanostructure
 Snowflake, a particle of snow
 Snowflake Computing, a cloud data warehouse company.

See also

 
 
 Fleck (disambiguation)

English-language surnames